Merk may refer to:

 Merk (coin), old Scottish coin worth 13 schillings and 4 pence Scots
 Merkland, old Scottish unit of land measurement 
 Mérk, village in eastern Hungary 
 Merk, Iran, village in Kurdistan Province, Iran
 Ernst Merk (1903–1976), World War II German army officer 
 Frederick Merk (1887–1977), American historian
 Joseph Merk (1795–1852), Austrian cellist and composer
 Larisa Merk (born 1971), Russian rower
 Markus Merk (born 1962), German football referee 
 Waldemar Merk (born 1959), Polish sprint canoer
 Merk (musician) (born 1994), New Zealander indie  musician

See also
 Merc (disambiguation)
 Merck (disambiguation)
 Mark (disambiguation)